Romashovka is a rural locality (a khutor) in Valuysky District, Belgorod Oblast, Russia. The population was 46 as of 2010. There are 2 streets.

Geography 
Romashovka is located 19 km southeast of Valuyki (the district's administrative centre) by road. Shelayevo is the nearest rural locality.

References 

Rural localities in Valuysky District